Diego Giovanni Ravelli (born 1 November 1965) is an Italian priest of the Catholic Church who has worked for the papal household since 1998 and has served as Master of Pontifical Liturgical Celebrations and head of the Pontifical Sistine Chapel Choir since October 2021.

Biography
Diego Giovanni Ravelli was born on 1 November 1965 in Lazzate. He was ordained a priest for the Public Clerical Association Priests of Jesus Crucified in 1991 and then incardinated in the diocese of Velletri-Segni.

In 2000 he obtained a diploma in pedagogical methodology from the Faculty of Educational Sciences at the Salesian Pontifical University in Rome. He earned a doctorate in sacred liturgy at the Liturgical Institute of the Pontifical Athenaeum of Saint Anselm in 2010.

He joined the Office of Papal Charities in 1998 and was named head of that office on 12 October 2003 and served in that post until October 2021. He directed the new annual lottery that raised funds for papal charities by raffling off gifts received by the pope. He was also chaplain at a spiritual center and assisted at a local parish in Rome.

He worked at the same time for the Office for the Liturgical Celebrations of the Supreme Pontiff, where he was an Assistant Master of Ceremonies. Pope Benedict XVI appointed him a Papal Master of Ceremonies on 25 February 2006, renewing that appointment in 2011. On 11 October 2021, Pope Francis named him Master of Pontifical Liturgical Celebrations and head of the Pontifical Sistine Chapel Choir.

In 2012 he published his academic research, a historical study of the celebration of the feast of the Chair of Saint Peter in the Vatican basilica.

In December 2017, his home town of Lazzate awarded him its highest honor, the Pila d'Oro.

Writings
  "a manual with a detailed historical component"

References
 

 

Living people
1965 births
Liturgists
People from the Province of Monza e Brianza
Salesian Pontifical University alumni
Pontifical Atheneum of St. Anselm alumni